Chelativorans oligotrophicus is a Gram-negative, aerobic, non-motile bacteria from the genus of Chelativorans.

References

External links
Type strain of Chelativorans oligotrophicus at BacDive -  the Bacterial Diversity Metadatabase

Phyllobacteriaceae
Bacteria described in 2010